Prerana Senior Secondary School, Nawalgarh is a school located in the Nawalgarh town, of Jhunjhunu district of Indian, state Rajasthan. It is a fully residential school which offering school study in Hindi medium from LKG level to the 10+2 level. Its centre code is 1150019.

History
The school was established in July 1990 and started its operations from the same year itself. Initially, it was offering study till 8th standard. But after a few years it got secondary school status from the Board of Secondary Education, Rajasthan (BSER) and subsequently, it started offering study till 10th standard. In July 2001, BSER granted senior secondary school status to it. Thereafter, from the start of academic year in July 2001, the school also started offering school study till +2 standard in the art, science and commerce stream. As per Indian school education system, there are class naming from Ist standard to 12th standard.

Faculties
At present, school have three sections: Primary, Middle and Senior Secondary section. In Senior Secondary section it is offering study in 4 streams viz. Science, Commerce, Art, and Agriculture streams.

References

External links and references
Board of Secondary Education Rajasthan
Batchmates
Names  Database
Satellite view of Prerana School

High schools and secondary schools in Rajasthan
Boarding schools in Rajasthan
Education in Jhunjhunu district
Educational institutions established in 1990
1990 establishments in Rajasthan